The Rudolph Tietig House is a historic home in Cincinnati designed by Rudolph Tietig's Tietig & Lee architecture firm.

References

Houses in Cincinnati